Tapan Das (11 January 1962) is an Indian film actor, director and story writer in Assamese cinema and mobile theatre. He also performs in stage plays.

Early life
Das was born on 11 January 1962 in Guwahati. He has been associated with acting since early 80s when he was in high school. His father was an officer at PWD department in Assam, was frequently transferred from one place to another. So he had studied in different schools of Assam. He studied in the prestigious Assam Engineering College, as said by himself in an Interview. He became a popular actor by doing various stage plays in Guwahati.

Career
Das made his debut in Assamese film through Pulak Gogoi's Sendoor in 1984. Till now he acted in more than 20 Assamese films. Apart from films, Das has been also involved in mobile theatres. He acted in Kohinoor, Bordoisila, Shakuntala Theatre, Rajtilak Theatre and Theatre Surjya. He also did direction in above theatres and Hengool Theatre. In 2011, he signed in Rajtilak Theatre. After that he has been associated with Theatre Surjya.

Filmography

Published Book
Meghmallar
Tapan Dasor Nirbasito Golpo

Awards
2012 - Rupkar Award

References

External links
 

Living people
Assamese actors
Assamese-language film directors
Male actors from Guwahati
1962 births
20th-century Indian male actors
21st-century Indian male actors